Fiordland National Park occupies the southwest corner of the South Island of New Zealand. The park is administered by the Department of Conservation. 

 of Fiordland were set aside as a national reserve in 1904, following suggestions by then-future Prime Minister Thomas Mackenzie and Southland Commissioner of Crown Lands, John Hay, that the region should be declared a national park.

The area had already become a destination for trampers, following the opening up of the Milford Track from Lake Te Anau to Milford Sound in 1889 by New Zealand explorers Quintin McKinnon and Donald Sutherland, which received significant publicity from a 1908 article in the London Spectator describing it as the "Finest Walk in the World".

The Fiordland "public reserve" was created as a park administered by the Department of Lands and Survey - in practical terms similar to a National Park.  The only two officially named "national parks" in New Zealand at the time, Tongariro National Park and Egmont National Park, were administered by park boards.  Consolidation of the management of these parks led to the National Parks Act of 1952, which brought Fiordland National Park into the fold, formally making it the third National Park in New Zealand.

The only main road into the park,  (SH 94), reached the Homer Tunnel area in 1935, but it was only with the tunnel's completion in 1953 that Milford Sound was accessible by road - to date the only fiord in the national park with road access.

Fiordland became the scene of one of New Zealand's most significant conservation debates when in the 1960s it was proposed to raise the level of Lake Manapouri to assist hydro-electricity production at West Arm. The ensuing battle resulted in government ultimately bowing to the weight of petitions and passing a bill in the 1970s that gave the lake statutory protection.

In 1986, Fiordland National Park was individually recognised as a World Heritage Site, and in 1990, together with three other national parks to the north, as part of the Te Wahipounamu World Heritage Area.

The park's protected area includes all of the islands along its coast, as well as the remote Solander Islands.  Although the park's seaward-boundary is at the mean high water mark, a total of ten adjoining marine reserves protect large areas of water in several of the fiords.  The most recent expansion of Fiordland National Park was the 1999 addition of the  Waitutu Forest.  Possible future additions are Big Bay, parts of the Livingston/Eglinton Ranges, and the Dean/Rowallan catchment area.

Geographical features

During the cooler past, glaciers carved many deep fiords, the most famous (and most visited) of which is Milford Sound / Piopiotahi. Other notable fiords include Doubtful Sound / Patea and Tamatea / Dusky Sound.

The southern ranges of the Southern Alps / Kā Tiritiri o te Moana cover most of Fiordland National Park and, combined with the deep glacier-carved valleys, present a highly inaccessible landscape. The Kepler, Dingwall, Kaherekoau, Princess and Cameron Mountains further south only reach .

The carving action of the glaciers has succeeded in cutting off islands from the mainland, leaving two large uninhabited offshore islands, Secretary Island and Resolution Island, as well as many smaller ones.  Although these glaciers are long-gone, a few small glaciers and permanent snow fields remain, with the southernmost glacier situated below Caroline Peak.

Several large lakes lie wholly or partly within the park's boundaries, notably Lake Te Anau and Lake Manapouri, both on the western boundary of the national park, as well as the southern lakes Lake Monowai, Lake Hauroko, and Lake Poteriteri.  All of these lakes exhibit the topography typical of glacier-carved valleys, with Lake Te Anau and Lake Manapouri in particular having several arms similar in look to the fiords on the west coast of the park.

The Sutherland Falls, to the southwest of Milford Sound on the Milford Track, are among the world's highest waterfalls.  Other tall waterfalls in the park include Browne Falls, Humboldt Falls, Lady Alice Falls, and Bowen Falls, as well as countless temporary waterfalls in the fiords that come alive following rainfall.

Prevailing westerly winds blow moist air from the Tasman Sea onto the mountains; the cooling of this air as it rises produces a prodigious amount of rainfall, exceeding seven metres in many parts of the park. This supports the lush temperate rain forests of the Fiordland temperate forests ecoregion.

Vegetation and wildlife
Fiordland National Park contains the majority of the largest area of unmodified vegetation in New Zealand.  The dense forests, often clinging to steep valley sides, comprise mostly silver beech and mountain beech, but also podocarps.  A large variety of shrubs and ferns, often dominated by crown fern, make up a rich understory of plants, with the forest floor covered in mosses and liverworts.  The abundant vegetation is supported by the high rainfall, but continues to be damaged by introduced species such as red deer and possum.

The park is also a significant refuge for many threatened native animals, ranging from dolphins and bats to reptiles, insects, and birds. Among the birds are several endangered species endemic to New Zealand such as the takahē, mōhua (yellowhead), and the critically endangered kakapo, the only flightless parrot in the world.  The vulnerable Fiordland crested penguin and southern brown kiwi are also almost exclusively found within the park.

The special nature of the Fiordland area for conservation was recognised in the late 1890s by Richard Henry, pioneering the transfer of threatened species such as kakapo and kiwi to islands in Dusky Sound. Conservation work and management of endangered species continues via a number of programmes by the Department of Conservation. The Takahē Recovery Programme ensures the survival of the last wild population of takahē. This unique bird, the largest living member of the rail family, was once thought to be extinct. Although the National Park comprises 15% of New Zealand's conservation estate, it receives less than 1% of the Department of Conservation's pest-control budget.

Several offshore islands belonging to Fiordland National Park are dedicated sanctuaries for threatened native species:

Anchor Island - kakapo, little spotted kiwi, tieke (saddleback), mōhua
Bauza Island - tieke
Breaksea Island - tieke, mōhua, knobbled weevil, Fiordland skink
Chalky Island - Te Kakahu skink, tieke, mōhua, kakapo, little spotted kiwi, orange-fronted kakariki
Coal Island - tokoeka (Haast brown kiwi), mōhua
Indian Island
Passage Islands
Resolution Island - New Zealand rock wren, mōhua, tieke, knobbled weevil
Secretary Island - Fiordland crested penguin, kiwi/tokoeka, rock wren, kōkako, takahē, mōhua, endemic mistletoe species

Mōhua and tokoeka (Haast brown kiwi) have also been released on Pomona Island in Lake Te Anau, and the Eglinton Valley contains significant populations of long-tailed bats.

In addition to these sanctuaries, there are also three sizeable possum-free islands in the fiords of the national park: Cooper Island and Long Island in Dusky Sound / Tamatea, and Great Island in Taiari / Chalky Inlet.  However, these islands are still occupied by stoats, rats or mice, compromising their suitability as bird sanctuaries.

Public access

Main road access into Fiordland National Park is limited to the Milford Road (SH 94), which runs north from Te Anau, skirting the edge of the park before entering the park as the highway joins the valley of the Eglinton River just north of Te Anau Downs. From there the road continues to the northwest corner of the park, reaching its terminus at Milford Sound / Piopiotahi, where there is a large car park, a wharf for the tour boats, and a visitor centre.  An unsealed side road in the upper Hollyford Valley leads to the start of the Hollyford Track.

A handful of other roads provide access to various entry points into the national park:
  runs close to the park's boundary between Te Anau and Manapouri, with minor side roads to two entry points along the Kepler loop track,
 a narrow winding gravel road runs along the Borland and the Grebe Valley, providing access to three tramping tracks and to a campsite at Lake Manapouri's South Arm,
 a short unsealed access road leads to a campsite at Lake Monowai and the start of two tramping tracks,
 another unsealed road runs up the Lill Burn Valley and to tramping tracks in the area south of Lake Hauroko, including a track to Lake Poteriteri, the largest lake in New Zealand with no road access.

A gravel road not connected to the rest of the public road network links Doubtful Sound with the western edge of Lake Manapouri via Wilmot Pass.  That road is only used by shuttle buses for Doubtful Sound tours from Manapouri, which include a boat transfer across Lake Manapouri and bus transfer over Wilmot Pass to tour boats awaiting at a small jetty in Doubtful Sound.

Light aircraft and helicopter services link with Milford Sound, which also has a small boat marina.

Parts of Fiordland National Park are a designated Wilderness Area and aircraft landings are not permitted.  The Wilderness Areas award special protection for large tracts of wild land containing natural features of such significance that they are preserved in their natural condition, without any man-made structures or facilities.  Entry is usually restricted to foot travel, there are typically no tramping tracks, and in some cases, special permits are required, such as for several offshore islands and the Takahē Specially Protected Area in the Murchison Mountains.

Activities

Fiordland National Park is the most popular national park in New Zealand for international visitors.  Well over half a million people visit the national park every year, however, the visitor numbers are almost exclusively concentrated in the park's north-eastern corridor from Te Anau to Milford Sound.

Most tourists are attracted to the easily accessible areas of the national park such as Milford Sound, where boat tours of the fiord and kayaking are the most popular activities.  Some boat tour packages include a visit to the Milford Discovery Centre & Underwater Observatory.
Along the Milford Road from Te Anau there are also camping grounds and several short walks, some of which are even accessible by wheelchair.  Popular stopping points along the road are at the Mirror Lakes, the Homer Pass area immediately to the east of the tunnel, and The Chasm.

Te Anau, situated on the shore of Lake Te Anau, is the closest town to the national park and provides many accommodation options as well as all the amenities expected of a small town.  The only other settlement close to the park is the much smaller Manapouri.

Doubtful Sound also offers boat tours.  These day-long tours depart from Manapouri and include return boat transfer across Lake Manapouri and bus transfer over Wilmot Pass to get to Doubtful Sound.  From Te Anau, boat trips across the lake to the Te Ana-au Caves are available.

Fiordland National Park is also a popular destination for alpine climbers and especially for trampers, with the multi-day Milford, Kepler and Hollyford tracks, and half of the Routeburn Track within the park.  The latter three can also be walked in and out as day walks, whereas access to both ends of the Milford Track is only via boat and is regulated and must be pre-booked, in particular during the summer peak season.

Aside from these major tramping tracks, which also offer guided walks, dozens of lesser known tracks are maintained by the Department of Conservation, ranging from tracks requiring intermediate skills, such as the Hump Ridge Track and the Lake Marian track to advanced multi-day hikes like the Dusky Track and several routes that should only be attempted by experienced trampers.  Fiordland is a challenging tramping destination, and given the size of the national park, there are few tracks.  Off-track travel by expert trampers often relies on following deer trails.  Sandflies, flooding and poor weather are a hazard, and being stranded for a day or two due to flooded river crossings is not uncommon on tracks like the Dusky Track.  Trampers on these remote tracks also face three-wire bridges, tree falls, and rough terrain where mud can be knee-deep.

Milford Sound / Piopiotahi, Te Houhou / George Sound, Doubtful Sound / Patea, and Dusky Sound / Tamatea are the only fiords accessible via tracks or routes.  Inland, the southern lakes of Lake Monowai and Lake Hauroko have road access to campsites and tracks, and Lake Poteriteri can be reached via a tramping track.

The steep granite peaks of the Darren Mountains are a popular area for mountain climbers.
The park is also a renowned destination for rainbow trout and brown trout fly fishing.

In popular culture
Parts of the 2017 film Alien: Covenant were filmed in the park.

Helicopter hunting

Red deer were introduced to New Zealand in the 1850s and they subsequently colonised the Fiordland Park area. By the 1920s, the large herds of wild deer in the NZ back country competing with sheep and cattle for feed resulted in pressure on the NZ government from the farming community, and deer cullers were employed by the Internal Affairs department to indiscriminately shoot deer in an effort to reduce the population. Costs were recouped from the sale of deer hides.

During the early 1960s, an international market for wild venison was established, and with no restrictions on hunting, market hunters established themselves in the rugged park country and used pack horses, jetboats and fixed wing aircraft to get the carcasses out to market. Experiments with shooting wild deer from helicopters were highly successful and a competitive industry was based on this technique. By the late 1970s, the deer population in Fiordland had been severely reduced, and combined with a flourishing deer farming industry this has reduced the impact of aerial hunting over the national park.

Market hunting from helicopters continues today in a reduced fashion, with the largest market being Germany. The Department of Conservation uses helicopters to poison the possum population with aerial dropping of 1080 poison, despite some public opposition.

See also
National parks of New Zealand
Forest parks of New Zealand
Regional parks of New Zealand
Protected areas of New Zealand
Conservation in New Zealand
Department of Conservation

References

External links

 Fiordland National Park, Department of Conservation
 Fiordland Coastal Newsletter

 
 
National parks of New Zealand
Protected areas of Southland, New Zealand
Protected areas established in 1952